Metin Salihoğlu (born 1928) is a Turkish former sports shooter. He competed in the trap event at the 1968 Summer Olympics.

References

External links
 

1928 births
Possibly living people
Turkish male sport shooters
Olympic shooters of Turkey
Shooters at the 1968 Summer Olympics
Sportspeople from Istanbul
20th-century Turkish people